Two Japanese naval vessels have been named :

 , a cruiser of the Imperial Japanese Navy that fought in the Saga Rebellion, Taiwan Expedition and Satsuma Rebellion.
 , an aircraft carrier of the Imperial Japanese Navy that fought in World War II.

Imperial Japanese Navy ship names
Japanese Navy ship names